"Leave It All to Me" is the debut single by American actress and singer Miranda Cosgrove, featuring Drake Bell, from the Nickelodeon show iCarlys soundtrack album of the same name (2008). The song was written by Michael Corcoran, one of Bell's band members. It was released as the lead single from the album on December 18, 2007, by Nickelodeon Records and distributed by Sony BMG Music Entertainment, standing as Cosgrove's debut release. A remix by Billboard was released on the soundtrack album iCarly: iSoundtrack II on January 24, 2012.

The song served as the theme song for the original show and the 2021 revival. A pop song, it is about seeing the brighter side of every situation. It peaked at number 100 on the US Billboard Hot 100, giving both Cosgrove and Bell their first Hot 100 hit in the United States. A music video was released for the song in June 2008 and was later uploaded to Cosgrove's YouTube channel in September 2010. Cosgrove performed "Leave It All to Me" during her debut solo tour the Dancing Crazy Tour in 2011.

Background and composition

Cosgrove was asked by the producers of iCarly if she wanted to record a theme song for the show. The actress explained she had never made a song or been in a recording studio, but agreed and was very excited. She recalled that she had a good time making the song and wanted to record more of it. After it was recorded, "Leave It All to Me" ended up being the theme song for iCarly. Cosgrove told Seventeen that "Leave It All to Me" would serve as the theme song for the 2021 iCarly revival. The actress had to fight hard to keep the original recording of the song to serve as the revival's theme song: "We went around a bunch of times, thinking of maybe re-recording the same song now or doing a different song. But, for me, when I watch revivals, I always am hoping for the original theme song and I feel like none of them ever really stick with the original. So we ended up going with the same one in the end". The song was written by Michael Corcoran, one of Drake Bell's band members. It stars Cosgrove and features Bell, who co-starred with her in Drake & Josh. "Leave It All to Me" is a pop song. Lyrically, the song is about seeing the positives of every situation, giving the best effort possible, taking some chances, and realizing that some things are just intended to be.

Release and reception
"Leave It All to Me" was released on December 18, 2007, as the lead single on the soundtrack album "iCarly, through Nickelodeon and Columbia Records." A remix by Billboard was released on the soundtrack album iCarly: iSoundtrack II on January 24, 2012. Writing for MTV News, Crystal Bell ranked "Leave it All to Me" at number 12 on her The 17 Best Nickelodeon Theme Songs, Ranked list', saying that "the only thing that makes this better is knowing Drake Bell provided the background vocals". "Leave It All to Me" debuted and peaked at number 100 on the US Billboard Hot 100, giving Cosgrove and Bell their first Hot 100 hit in the United States. The song lasted for one week on the chart.

Promotion and impact 
The official music video for "Leave It All to Me" was released in June 2008. The video was later released to Cosgrove's YouTube channel on September 28, 2010. Cosgrove would perform "Leave It All to Me" during her first headlining 2011 concert tour the Dancing Crazy Tour. Bell joined Cosgrove to perform the song at Club Nokia, with his appearance gathering cheers from the crowd.

In January 2017, it had been around six years since Cosgrove released her second extended play High Maintenance, and took a break from making music to attend college at the University of Southern California. Bell wished she came back to making music and shared a throwback video of him and Cosgrove dancing to the song. In April 2017, Noah Cyrus revealed that she was a huge fan of iCarly. Cyrus made a video of herself lip-syncing the song and would later post it on her Instagram account.

Credits and personnel
Credits adapted from Tidal.

Miranda Cosgrove vocals
Drake Bell vocals
Michael Corcoran writer

Charts

References

External links
 

2007 songs
2007 debut singles
Sony BMG singles
Drake Bell songs
ICarly
Miranda Cosgrove songs
Songs written by Michael Corcoran (musician)
Children's television theme songs